Félicien (born May 13, 1978) is a French singer. He charted in 2002 in France when the single "Cum cum mania" reached No. 1. He also charted in 2003 with the song "Tranquile Emile".

Taris became known from appearing in Season 2 of Loft Story.

Discography

Album
 2003 : Olé, Olé

Singles
 2002 : Cum-Cum Mania
 2003 : Tranquille Emile
 2007 : Mi Casa Es Su Casa (with Los Niños)
 2009 : Ramaya (with King Félice)
 2010 : J'ai pas d'argent
 2012 : Viens squatter

References

External links

French pop singers
French record producers
1978 births
Living people
People from Orthez
21st-century French singers